"It's in the Mornin'" is a song by American R&B singer Robin Thicke with American rapper Snoop Dogg. Was released on 2010 as the single of his fourth studio album Sex Therapy: The Session, with the record labels Star Trak Entertainment and Interscope Records.

Music video 
A music video for the single was shot in March 2010 with The Price Is Rights Manuela Arbeláez playing his love interest. The video premiered on May 9, 2010.

 Track listing CD Single'
It's In The Mornin (Album Version) (with Snoop Dogg) — 3:02
It's In The Mornin (Instrumental) — 2:53

Chart performance

Weekly charts

References

2010 singles
Robin Thicke songs
Snoop Dogg songs
Songs written by Robin Thicke
Songs written by Snoop Dogg
Songs written by Teddy Riley
Song recordings produced by Teddy Riley
2009 songs
Star Trak Entertainment singles